The Star-Spangled Kid is the name of several superheroes in the DC Comics' main shared universe.

Fictional character history

Sylvester Pemberton

The original Star-Spangled Kid was Sylvester Pemberton, a Golden Age character, created by Jerry Siegel, the co-creator of Superman. He became the Star-Spangled Kid in order to battle Nazism during World War II. He was unique in that he was a kid superhero who had an adult sidekick, Stripesy a.k.a. Pat Dugan. Both he and Dugan were superb acrobats along with having sufficient training in hand-to-hand combat, but the pair regularly bickered about which of them should get top billing.

Decades later, he changed his name to Skyman and led Infinity Inc. He was killed when Harlequin III made Solomon Grundy touch Pemberton with Mister Bones's hand. Bones' cyanide touch killed him instantly.

Courtney Whitmore

Courtney is the stepdaughter of Pat Dugan. She finds Pemberton's gear in her stepfather's belongings and dons the Cosmic Converter Belt, with a costume of her own design. She begins her career as the second Star-Spangled Kid in order to annoy Dugan as partial revenge for him marrying her mother and supposedly forcing the family to move from Los Angeles to Blue Valley, Nebraska. Dugan, a skilled mechanic, designs and builds S.T.R.I.P.E., an armored robot which he rides in to accompany and protect her. Eventually, she joins the JSA and, after being given Jack Knight's cosmic rod, changes her identity to Stargirl.

Miss Martian

A third Star-Spangled Kid appears in Terror Titans #1 and is subsequently captured by the Terror Titans team for the Dark Side Club. The Star-Spangled Kid is forced to fight in a tournament against other meta-humans, going on to win the tournament. During the course of the storyline he appears to have a much stronger resistance to brainwashing than the other fighters, although he does eventually succumb. Later, it is revealed that he is the shape-shifting Miss Martian. She uses her immunity to the brainwashing to slowly free the other combatants.

Other versions
In Kingdom Come, Alex Ross portrays a later Star-Spangled Kid (simply called Stars) as an African-American street kid wearing a leather jacket, an American flag bandana, and a T-shirt with an inverted American flag, using the cosmic rod in conjunction with the cosmic converter belt. He, too, is accompanied by a muscular older man in a striped shirt, this one called Stripes.

In other media
 In Smallville, the Sylvester Pemberton version of the Star-Spangled Kid appeared in the season 9 episode Absolute Justice, where he contacts Chloe Sullivan before being killed by Icicle's son Cameron Mahkent after a brief fight.
 In the pilot episode of Stargirl, Pemberton operated as the Star-Spangled Kid in his teen years before taking the name Starman.
 In Tiny Titans, Star-Spangled Kid made an appearance on Tiny Titans #38.

References

External links
 DCU Guide: Star Spangled Kid
 Star-Spangled Kid and Stripesy at Don Markstein's Toonopedia Archived from the original on March 16, 2017. Additional WebCitation archive on June 4, 2017.
DC Comics superheroes
United States-themed superheroes